William Daniel Rhymes (born April 1, 1983) is an American former professional baseball second baseman and current front office executive for the Los Angeles Dodgers. His title is Director of Player Development. He played in Major League Baseball (MLB) for the Detroit Tigers and Tampa Bay Rays.

Early life
Rhymes was raised in Houston, Texas and has an identical twin brother named Jonathan.As a young child Rhymes first played baseball at West U. Little league in Houston, Texas where he first showcased his skills. Rhymes attended Lamar High School in Houston where he played baseball.

College career
Rhymes attended the College of William & Mary, where he played college baseball for the William & Mary Tribe. He majored in biology, rushed the fraternity of Lambda Chi Alpha, and graduated in 2005.

Rhymes first earned attention from major league scouts while playing collegiate summer baseball with the Brewster Whitecaps of the Cape Cod Baseball League in 2004. Though initially recruited as a temporary player, Rhymes's extraordinary effort and superb performance on the field earned him a contract through the entire summer and a starting spot at second base. Rhymes earned a reserve spot in the mid-season East Division All Stars as well as the post-season league-wide All Star Team.

Professional career
Rhymes was drafted by the Detroit Tigers in the 27th Round of the 2005 Major League Baseball Draft. He was promoted to the big league club on July 25, 2010, after injuries struck the Tigers lineup and made his major league debut the same day in a pinch-hitting role against the Toronto Blue Jays.

Rhymes was optioned back to the AAA Toledo Mud Hens following the return of the Tigers injured second baseman but was recalled August 18, 2010.

On September 20, 2010, Rhymes hit his first major league career home run off of Zack Greinke of the Kansas City Royals. Rhymes home run was initially ruled an RBI triple but after further review of the replay, the ruling on the field was overturned and ruled a two-run home run after it bounced off the horizontal iron support above the wall in right. This is the first incidence in which an instant replay review granted a player the first home run of their career.

It was announced at the start of the 2011 baseball season that Rhymes would make the Opening Day roster for the first time in his career, and would be the starting second baseman for the Tigers.

Rhymes played for the Tampa Bay Rays in 2012. On May 16, Rhymes was hit by a pitch  by Boston Red Sox pitcher Franklin Morales. This incident caused Rhymes to faint from an adrenaline rush after being struck by the 95 mph fastball. Rhymes played his last MLB game for the Rays on August 5, 2012.  He spent the 2013 season in the Washington Nationals organization. He became a free agent after the 2014 season and later retired.

Front office career
On March 17, 2019, Rhymes was promoted to director of player development in the Los Angeles Dodgers baseball operations department. Rhymes had previously served as assistant farm director.

References

External links

William & Mary Tribe baseball players
Detroit Tigers players
Tampa Bay Rays players
Toledo Mud Hens players
Erie SeaWolves players
Lakeland Flying Tigers players
West Michigan Whitecaps players
Brewster Whitecaps players
Oneonta Tigers players
Living people
1983 births
Identical twins
Baseball players from Houston
Durham Bulls players
Syracuse Chiefs players
American twins
Los Angeles Dodgers executives